A Peasant on a Bicycle is a Bulgarian drama film released in 1974, directed by Lyudmil Kirkov, starring Georgi Georgiev - Gets, Diana Chelebieva, Georgi Rusev and Evstati Stratev.

Plot
Born in the small village of Yugla, Yordan (Gets) lives with his family in the nearby town. Filled with homesickness he takes every opportunity, traveling  usually by his bicycle, to visit the more and more depopulated village. And that's how, mounted on the bike his life passes between the town and Yugla. During one of the visits to his old home he meets the newly appointed young pharmacist Maglena (Chelebieva). She is accommodated in his country house. Little by little Yordan falls in love with her.

Burning with love for both Maglena and the country life he starts persuading managers and colleagues, in the factory where he works, to move one of the workshops to the village of Yugla. He dreams that the far-off days of rural vitality can be born anew. He believes that in this way the young people will come back. But his nostalgia is not understood by the people. No one follows him. Moreover, he becomes gradually aware that Maglena, his new love, is from the different world of the new generation. He finally understands that those times are long gone and the only things remaining are the bicycle and loneliness.

Production
Production company:
Studio of Featured Films (SFF) - a Film Unit HEMUS
The film is also translated as The Peasant with the Bike 

Director:Lyudmil Kirkov
Writer: Georgi Mishev
Director of Photography: Georgi Rusinov
Music: Boris Karadimchev

Filmed: 1974; Premiere: 22 November 1974

Cast
Georgi Georgiev - Gets as Yordan
Georgi Rusev as Docho Bulgurov
Diana Chelebieva as Maglena
Evstati Stratev as the fellow-countryman
Svetoslav Peev as Angel
Lili Eneva as Yordan's wife
Zlatina Doncheva as Docho Bulgurov's wife
Georgi Kishkilov as Kaytashev
Mariana Alamancheva as Tancheto
Yuri Yakovlev as Maglena's father

Response
A reported 1,009,283 admissions were recorded for the film in cinemas throughout Bulgaria.

The film was subsumed among the 50 golden Bulgarian films in the book by the journalist Pencho Kovachev. The book was published in 2008 by "Zahariy Stoyanov" publishing house.

There were the following publications:
Film News Magazine, vol. 12-1974,p. 7 - by I. Bozhinova
Otechestven Front news paper, vol.9321-21.11.1974 - by E. Vasileva
FILM ART magazine, vol. 10,1973,p. 89 - published the screenplay
Bulgarian Film Magazine, vol.5, 1975,p. 14 - by G. Mishev
National Culture news paper, vol. 49-30.11.1974 - by V. Naydenova
New Films Magazine, vol.12-1974
Film News Magazine, vol. 5-1974,p. 2 - by M.Racheva

Awards
FBFF Varna'74 (Festival for Bulgarian Featured Films)
 Second Award for director Lyudmil Kirkov, screenwriter Georgi Mishev and the cameraman Georgi Rusinov
 The Critics Award
 Award for best actor in a leading role for Georgi Georgiev - Gets

9th Moscow International Film Festival
 Award for best actor in a leading role for Georgi Georgiev - Gets
 Award from Soviet Screen Magazine

Notes

References
Galina Gencheva, Bulgarian Feature Films vol.3, Dr. Petar Beron 2008 with the Bulgarian Cinematheque
Pencho Kovachev, 50 Golden Bulgarian Films, Zahariy Stoyanov 2008
Bulgarian National Film Archive 
The film in the Bulgarian National Television 
BNT Details

External links
 

1974 films
1974 drama films
Bulgarian drama films
1970s Bulgarian-language films
Films set in Bulgaria
Films shot in Bulgaria